An Alternative to Loud Boats was a performance art festival coinciding with the annual Seattle Seafair Albert Lee Cup Hydroplane Races held in late July or early August. It was organized by Roberto Valenza and Phoebe Bosche who were also involved with Red Sky Poetry Theatre.

In 1989, Cydney Gills of Arts Focus magazine joined with An Alternative to Loud Boats. Gillis assisted in writing grants.  An Alternative To Loud Boats received grants from the King County Arts Commission in 1991.

An Alternative to Loud Boats ran for 10 years, each year having a different theme.

1985

1986

1987 
An Alternative To Loud Boats celebrates the arts

1988 
Censorship

1989 
The Struggle For Freedom

1990 
Sanctuary

1991 
Between Two Fires

1992

1993 
No Garnish

1994

References

Poetry festivals in the United States
Festivals in Seattle
Performance art festivals
Spoken word
Festivals established in 1985
Recurring events disestablished in 1994
Art festivals in the United States
1985 establishments in Washington (state)
1994 disestablishments in Washington (state)